Ibrahim Osman may refer to:
 Ibrahim Osman (fencer)
 Ibrahim Osman (footballer, born 1999), Ghanaian footballer for Asante Kotoko
 Ibrahim Osman (footballer, born 2004), Ghanaian footballer for Nordsjælland